Diego Arturo Peralta González (born 2 January 1985) is a Colombian football defender that plays for Cúcuta Deportivo.

Honours

Club
Atlético Nacional
Categoría Primera A (2): 2013-II, 2014-I
Copa Colombia (1): 2013

References

External links

1984 births
Living people
Colombian footballers
Colombian expatriate footballers
Independiente Medellín footballers
Bogotá FC footballers
Atlético Bucaramanga footballers
Cúcuta Deportivo footballers
Deportivo Cali footballers
Atlético Nacional footballers
Deportivo Pasto footballers
Categoría Primera A players
Once Caldas footballers
Association football defenders
Colombian expatriate sportspeople in Panama
Expatriate footballers in Panama
People from Cúcuta